Hōshōryū Tomokatsu (豊昇龍 智勝, born May 22, 1999 as Byambasuren Sugarragchaa) is a professional sumo wrestler from Mongolia and wrestles for Tatsunami stable. He is known for his throwing skills, even when measured among Mongolian sumo wrestlers, who tend to use throws more than average reflecting the skills used in Bökh. He is the nephew of former yokozuna Asashōryū. His highest rank has been sekiwake.

Early life and sumo background
Born as the second son of former yokozuna Asashōryū's brother, Sugarragchaa started wrestling at 11 years old. Upon graduation from middle school, he was scouted from Mongolia, and moved to Japan to attend Nippon Sport Science University Kashiwa High School. In his first year, as part of a school trip, he visited the Kokugikan in Ryōgoku and became interested in sumo. After consulting with his uncle he committed to trying sumo at the high school level. Though he had no previous experience, he quickly started getting good results in amateur sumo tournaments and was seen as having great potential. After high school he joined Tatsunami stable. During this time he emailed regularly with his uncle who gave him such advice as "build on your own strengths" and "don't put on weight quickly or you'll risk injury."

Career

Hōshōryū first stepped into the ring professionally in March 2018. He joined at the same time as Naya, who was also garnering attention as the grandson of the greatly respected yokozuna Taihō. In Hōshōryū's  second tournament, he took the jonidan championship with a perfect 7-0 and was already regularly using throws and leg sweeps to win against his opponents. He only had one losing tournament, or make-koshi, in his rise through the lower ranks. This was a 3-4 performance at makushita 2 when he was on the cusp of promotion to the salaried ranks of jūryō in July 2019. He quickly bounced back the following tournament in September and with a 4-3 winning tournament, or kachi-koshi, he earned jūryō promotion for the November tournament in Fukuoka. His jūryō debut was a make-koshi, decided on the last day in a loss to fellow Mongolian Sakigake by overarm throw. Despite this setback he logged two 8-7 records in the next two consecutive tournaments. In the subsequent July 2020 tournament (held in Tokyo instead of the usual Nagoya due to concerns over the COVID-19 pandemic) he took part in a rare six man playoff, where he defeated Kyokutaisei. This culminated in a three man playoff between three members of the same Tatsunami stable. This playoff comprised himself, Akua, and Meisei. Bouts between stablemates are only allowed in the case of playoffs where two or more wrestlers end up with the same record, and is a rare occurrence. He was defeated by Meisei who went on to defeat Akua and take the championship. However, his performance was still enough to propel him into the top-tier makuuchi division for the September 2020 tournament. He is the 50th foreigner to reach the top division, and the 27th Mongolian.

In the July 2021 tournament Hōshōryū had his best result in the top division up to that point, winning ten bouts and the Technique Prize. This saw him promoted to a new highest rank of maegashira 1 for September, but in that tournament he had to withdraw on Day 5 with only one win, due to injury. However he returned on Day 8 and won four of his remaining eight matches.

In the January 2022 tournament he produced an 11–4 record. He was then promoted to san'yaku for the first time, ranked at komusubi for the March 2022 tournament. He achieved winning records in three consecutive tournaments at the komusubi rank, and earned promotion to sekiwake for the September 2022 tournament. In the November tournament, Hōshōryū stood up by winning his fifth bout with a rare kawazugake kimarite, a move not seen in 10 years. He was the outright leader of the tournament after Day 11 with just one loss, He ultimately finished on 11–4, but this was still his best performance to date in the san'yaku ranks and he received his 2nd Technique Prize of his career. Hōshōryū had hopes of promotion to  if he produced double-digit wins in the next tournament, but he withdrew on Day 10 of the January 2023 tournament with a sprained left ankle. Hōshōryū returned to the tournament on Day 12 having missed just one day, and preserved his  rank on the final day, winning his eighth match after his opponent Ōnoshō was disqualified for a hair pull.

Fighting style
Hōshōryū's Japan Sumo Association profile lists his preferred grip on his opponent's mawashi is migi-yotsu, a left hand outside, right hand inside position. He is fond of using shitatenage (underarm throw) and yori kiri (force out). He also likes the outside leg trip or sotogake, which is beginning to be seen as a trademark move of his.

Career record

See also
Glossary of sumo terms
List of active sumo wrestlers
List of sekiwake

References

External links

1999 births
Living people
Mongolian sumo wrestlers
Tatsunami stable sumo wrestlers
Sportspeople from Ulaanbaatar
Sekiwake